The Official Album of the 2002 FIFA World Cup is a compilation album with various artists, released in 2002 by Sony Music Entertainment Japan. This albums is the official music album of the 2002 FIFA World Cup in South Korea and Japan. The album spawned the single We're on the Ball by Ant & Dec. The album was also released under the name Fever Pitch: The Official Music of The 2002 FIFA World Cup, but without the "We're on the Ball" by Ant & Dec.

Track listing
The following is the track listing from Fever Pitch; The Official Album of the 2002 FIFA World Cup differs only in the addition of We're on the Ball at number 2.

Singles

International CD Single
(SINCD8; Released )
"Live for Love United" – 5:08

Charts

Korean/Japanese edition

2002 FIFA World Cup Official Album Songs of Korea/Japan is an edition featuring Korean and Japanese musicians called Songs of Korea/Japan was also released, which was a commercial success in Japan. It was certified platinum for 200,000 copies shipped to stores by the RIAJ.

Track listing

 Disc 1
 Anthem (Takkyu Ishino remix) - Vangelis
 Let's Get Together Now - 
 Devil - B'z
 Escort - Gospellers
 One Love Wonderful World - Ken Hirai
 I'll be - Mr.Children
 I will follow - TUBE
 Go Steady Go! - Porno Graffitti
 Fantasista - Dragon Ash
 United Soul (World Mix) - T-Square

 Disc 2
 Last Song - Asian H
 The Player's Creed - Kim Jo-han
 Ready - Park Jin-young
 Gotta Get Love - J
 Friend - Lee Ki-chan
 Glorious - Lena Park
 Dream - Hwayobi
 Burning - Jein

See also
 List of FIFA World Cup songs and anthems

References

Album Of The Official Album of the 2002 FIFA World Cup
2002 soundtrack albums
Sony Music Entertainment Japan albums
FIFA World Cup albums
2002 compilation albums